Ugsarmal bair (assembled building), or just Ugsarmal, is the Mongolian term for high rise panel buildings. Most of these buildings were built in the 1970s and 1980s with Soviet funding and Soviet designs, in order to supply a greater share of Mongolia's population with flats equipped with modern amenities (tap water, sanitation, central heating). Ugsarmals in Ulaanbaatar, Erdenet and Darkhan are often high-rises, while those in the aimag centers usually have only four floors. Most public flats in Mongolia, including those in Ugsarmals, were privatized in the early 1990s. Nowadays, prices for a three-room apartment in the centre of Ulaanbaatar range from about 60,000 US dollars upwards.

Other countries
The term Ugsarmal bair refers specifically to buildings in Mongolia. However, similar buildings (Plattenbau) were built in other Communist countries and some Western countries.

Eastern bloc housing
Khrushchyovka (Soviet Union)
Panelák (Czechoslovakia)
Panelház (Hungary)
Plattenbau (East Germany)
Systematization (Romania)

Other countries
Million Programme (Sweden)

See also
Urban planning in communist countries

Architecture in Mongolia
Housing